As a surname, Lie may refer to

A Norwegian surname Lie, which may refer to:
 Anders Danielsen Lie, Norwegian actor
 Jonas Lie (government minister), Norwegian councillor of state
 Jonas Lie (painter), Norwegian-American painter
 Jonas Lie (writer), Norwegian novelist
 Sophus Lie, Norwegian mathematician
 Trygve Lie, Norwegian politician, first Secretary-General of the United Nations
 Haakon Lie, Norwegian politician
 Kaare Lie, Norwegian footballer and journalist
 Niels Lie, Danish chess player
 Reidar Lie, Norwegian philosopher
The common Hokkien transcription of Chinese surname Li (李), spelled Lie (Pe̍h-ōe-jī: Lí) in Indonesia and Netherlands:
 Lie Kim Hok, peranakan Chinese writer, social worker
 Lie Tek Swie, Indonesian film director
 Lie Tjeng Tjoan, Indonesian navy commander during the Indonesian National Revolution

See also
Lie (disambiguation)

Hokkien-language surnames
Norwegian-language surnames